Flérida Ruth Pineda-Romero (August 1, 1929 – December 8, 2017) was an Associate Justice of the Supreme Court of the Philippines.

Born in Tondo, Manila, Romero received a law degree from the University of the Philippines College of Law in 1952, and an LL.M. from the Indiana University Maurer School of Law in 1955. Justice Romero was inducted into the Indiana University School of Law's Academy of Alumni Fellows in 1994. She was awarded an honorary LL.D. in 2000. She was Director and Dean of the University of the Philippines School of Labor and Industrial Relations from 1962 to 1963. She became known as an expert on the Civil Code of the Philippines and was a long-time professor at the UP College of Law.

In 1986, Romero became a Special Assistant to President Corazon Aquino, and in 1991, Aquino appointed her to replace Abraham Sarmiento in the Supreme Court of the Philippines. Romero assumed office on October 21, 1991, and served until her 70th birthday, August 1, 1999, at which time she was required to step down from the court due to the age limit imposed by the Constitution of the Philippines. During her service on the court, she served on the panel which began the investigation into the GSIS-Meralco bribery case.

External links
 Supreme Court E-Library page on Associate Justice Flérida Ruth P. Romero

1929 births
2017 deaths
People from Tondo, Manila
Associate Justices of the Supreme Court of the Philippines
Filipino women lawyers
Filipino women judges
20th-century women judges
20th-century Filipino judges